WCHR (1040 AM) is a religious radio station in Flemington, New Jersey serving Trenton, New Jersey which is owned and operated by Townsquare Media.

History
Originally the station operated as WJHR ("Jersey Hometown Radio") with an adult contemporary format. It briefly broadcast a talk format called "Chat Radio" and had short stints as a business talk station and an ESPN Radio affiliate before adopting the call letters and religious format of WCHR, which had been operating on 920 AM in Trenton, in 2002.

On January 3, 2008, Nassau Broadcasting Partners announced that 1040 would drop the religious format and switch to a full-time simulcast of New York City's WEPN. Nassau moved the religious programming and the WCHR call sign back to 920, which had been broadcasting as a Philadelphia-oriented ESPN Radio affiliate under the call letters WPHY. On February 5, 2008, the station took the WNJE call sign.

On May 21, 2012, WNJE ended the simulcast of WEPN and joined ESPN Deportes Radio; this came in advance of WEPN's own switch to ESPN Deportes Radio in September, after ESPN Radio took over the operations of WEPN-FM in April.

WNJE, along with nine other Nassau stations in New Jersey and Pennsylvania, was purchased at bankruptcy auction by NB Broadcasting in May 2012. NB Broadcasting is controlled by Nassau's creditors — Goldman Sachs, Pluss Enterprises, and P.E. Capital. In November, NB Broadcasting filed a motion to assign its rights to the stations to Connoisseur Media.

On December 3, 2012 WNJE dropped ESPN Deportes Radio and began simulcasting the religious format of sister station WCHR 920.

The sale to Connoisseur Media, at a price of $38.7 million, was consummated on May 29, 2013.

On November 13, 2013, the simulcast of the religious format ended, and the Christian programming was subsequently heard only on 1040 as 920 adopted a secular talk format. The WCHR call sign was once again moved to 1040, and 920 became WNJE.

Effective July 2, 2018, WCHR and sister stations WNJE and WPST were sold to Townsquare Media for $17.3 million.

References

External links

Flemington, New Jersey
CHR
Townsquare Media radio stations